The Orinoco Belt is a territory in the southern strip of the eastern Orinoco River Basin in Venezuela which overlies the world's largest deposits of petroleum. Its local Spanish name is Faja Petrolífera del Orinoco (Orinoco Petroleum Belt).

The Orinoco Belt is located in Guárico and south of the Anzoátegui, Monagas, and Delta Amacuro states, and it follows the line of the river.

Oil reserves

The Orinoco Belt consists of large deposits of extra heavy crude. No estimate of how much of the oil is economically recoverable was made.

The Orinoco Belt is currently divided into four exploration and production areas. These are: Boyacá (before Machete), Junín (before Zuata), Ayacucho (before Hamaca), and Carabobo (before Cerro Negro).

Development

Oil Sowing Plan 2005–2030 
Source:The data in this section are taken directly from the official PDVSA web page.

Venezuela power policy guidelines until the year 2030 are drawn up in the "Oil Sowing Plan” ("Plan Siembra Petrolera"), which includes six development projects and consists of two stages: one to be executed in the period 2005–2012, and another, to be developed in the second stage, 2012 and 2030.

For the first period of this Plan, an overall investment of around US $56 billion  has been estimated between 2005 and 2012. 70% of that amount will be financed by Venezuela — state operator — and the rest by the private sector.

Oil Sowing Plan 2005–2012 includes six fundamental axes:

Magna Reserve Project: Destined toward the quantifying and certifying of oil reserves in the Orinoco Oil Belt. Of this amount  were heavy or extra heavy oil, including 37 billion reserves of extra heavy in the Orinoco Belt (1 in Machete, 15 in Zuata, 6 in Hamaca and 15 in Cerro Negro). This indicates that Venezuela’s reserves, according to PDVSA, in 2001 were  excluding the Orinoco Belt.
 Orinoco Project: In charge of developing the Orinoco Belt. Twenty-seven blocks have been selected for development under this project with the cooperation of selected companies. Because of the strategic location of this hydrocarbon reservoir, it is considered of vital importance in reducing levels of overcrowding in some parts of the country and providing local employment. Services and housing will be developed to guarantee adequate oil exploitation.
Delta-Caribbean Project: Gas will be incorporated to the country energy supply. This project pursues offshore gas development in the Deltana Platform off the coast of eastern Venezuela. Further developments are located in the Paraguaná Peninsula, to the north-west of the country.
Refinement:  To increase refinement capacity in Venezuela is one of PDVSA’s strategic goals. Oil Sowing Plan undertakes the creation of new refineries: Cabruta (with capacity for 400,000 extra-heavy crude barrels per day), Batalla de Santa Ines and Caripito ( destined to asphalt production).
Infrastructure: More filling centers and pipelines will be set up to guarantee fuel supplies to the whole nation. The agreement for the construction of the Transguajiro gas pipeline between Venezuela and Colombia has been signed in 2005.
Integration: According to Hugo Chávez's aims, oil is to be used as a geopolitical resource helping the integration of the peoples of Latin America and the Caribbean. Venezuela thus created Petrocaribe and signed the Petrosur agreement. A refinery was also to be built close to Petrobras in Brazil.

Production blocks
Production blocks will be developed by PDVSA in cooperation with foreign partners. In all partnership PDVSA owns 60%.

Junin
Junin block 2 is under development in cooperation with Petrovietnam. SNC-Lavalin was awarded the engineering contract on March 10, 2010. It is expected to produce  by 2011. The development will include also a heavy crude upgrader; however, its commissioning date is not specified. Junin block 4 is developed in cooperation with CNPC (40%). It is expected to produce ; however, the commissioning date is not announced. Junin block 5 is developed in cooperation with Eni (40%). The development will include an oil refinery for production of motor fuels. Junin block 6 is developed in cooperation with a consortium of Russian oil companies, including Rosneft, Gazprom Neft, Lukoil, TNK-BP and Surgutneftegaz. It is expected to produce ; however, the commissioning date is not announced.

Carabobo
Carabobo 1 is developed in cooperation with Repsol YPF (11%), Petronas (11%), ONGC (11%), Indian Oil Corporation (3.5%), and Oil India (3.5%). It consists of Carabobo block 1 North and block 1 Central. The expected production output will be  by 2013. The upgrader is expected to be ready by 2017.

Carabobo 3 is developed in cooperation with Chevron Corporation (34%), Suelopetrol (1%) pct,  and Mitsubishi Corporation and Inpex (5%).  It consists of Carabobo block 2 South, block 3, and block 5.  The expected production output will be  by 2013. The upgrader is expected to be ready by 2017.

Carabobo 2 will be developed in cooperation with Rosneft and Corporation Venezolana del Petroleo (CVP) - a subsidiary of Venezuela’s state oil and gas company PDVSA. The agreement, signed by Rosneft CEO Igor Sechin and Venezuelan Oil Minister, PDVSA chief Rafael Ramirez in the presence of President Hugo Chávez, establishes a joint venture to develop the Carabobo 2 bloc in the southern Orinoco extra-heavy crude belt in Venezuela.

The signed memorandum established Rosneft's share will be 40 percent. Rosneft will pay CVP a bonus of $1.1 billion, paid out in two installments: $440 million within ten days after the establishment of the joint venture, and the rest after Rosneft makes the final decision on the project. In addition, Rosneft will issue a $1.5 billion loan to CVP for five years. The loan will be provided in tranches of not more than $300 million annually at the annual interest rate of LIBOR+5.5 percent.
To develop the Carabobo 2 bloc Rosneft will invest a total of $16 billion, according to CEO Igor Sechin. The Carabobo 2 bloc’s reserves total 6.5 billion metric tons of crude. Commercial oil production at the bloc is expected to hit 400,000 barrels per day.
Rosneft, along with several Russian oil companies  (Gazprom Neft, Lukoil, TNK-BP and Surgutneftegaz), have formed a consortium to develop the Junin bloc 6 of the Orinoco belt in Venezuela.

The formation waters from the boreholes show a main Na-Cl level (TDS up to 30g/L) with a dilution trend toward Na-HCO3 composition (down to 1g/L). The stable isotope ratio of oxygen and hydrogen of water molecule reveal that the seawater mother water was modified during a high-temperature thrusting event (120–125°C), forming 18O-enriched diagenetic water (up to +4‰), which was diluted in recent times by glacial meltwater and presentday meteoric water. The hypothetical presence of flood by a meteoric paleo-water also offers new hints to explain the low API gravity (<10°API biodegraded, extra heavy oil) and composition of the local crude.

See also

Orinoco Mining Arc
List of oil fields
San Tomé, Venezuela
Hollis Dow Hedberg

References

External links
Faja Petrolífera del Orinoco.
Department of Earth Science, Rice University, The Orinoco Heavy Oil Belt In Venezuela (or Heavy Oil to the Rescue?).

Eastern Venezuela Basin
Geography of Venezuela
Oil fields of Venezuela
Bituminous sands